Andrei Sergeyevich Malykh (born 24 August 1988) is a Russian professional football player. He plays as a right-back for FC Orenburg.

Club career
On 28 May 2022, Malykh scored an added-time winning goal for FC Orenburg in promotion play-offs against FC Ufa which secured Orenburg's victory and promotion to the Russian Premier League.

Career statistics

References

External links
 
 

1988 births
Sportspeople from Kirov, Kirov Oblast
Living people
Russian footballers
Association football defenders
FC Dynamo Kirov players
FC Orenburg players
Russian Second League players
Russian First League players
Russian Premier League players